is a Japanese manga series written and illustrated by Masahiro Totsuka.

Plot
Set in a fictional world where magic is used, Mikaze is sent by the two elders of his village to ask the 3 great immortal magicians to help his village from being overtaken by a large fungi called the Yamakuidake (Mountain eating Mushroom). So he starts his quest and climbs up the mountain that the Three Magicians live on to ask but upon meeting the 3 Magicians he learns that the other two are gone and he is left with Aqua, a young girl who uses candy as a wand. Eventually they strike an agreement, she will go and help his village as long as he brings her back safe and sound to the mountain afterwards. The only problem is that as a sign of their agreement he has to wear a mask until the agreement is fulfilled.

References

External links

2002 manga
Fantasy anime and manga
Gangan Comics manga
Kodansha manga
Seinen manga
Shōnen manga